Bucephalus elegans is a species of Trematoda. It is parasitic in the clam species Eurynia iris, which is found in the Huron River, near Ann Arbor, Michigan.

References

 Response to Light in the Cercariae of Bucephalus elegans. Gerrit Bevelander, Physiological and Biochemical Zoology, Volume 6, Number 3, July 1933

External links

Plagiorchiida
Natural history of Michigan
Animals described in 1930